Wallenpaupack Lake Estates is a private community and census-designated place in Paupack Township, Wayne County in the U.S. State of Pennsylvania. The community's population was 1,279 as of the 2010 United States Census.

Geography

Demographics
As of the census of 2010, there were 1,279 people and 405 families residing in the community. The racial makeup of the community was 96.0% White, 2.3% Black or African American, 0.2% American Indian or Alaska Native, 0.3% Asian. 0.4% of the community's inhabitants classified themselves as being from other races, and 0.8% identified as two or more races. Hispanics and Latinos of any race made up 3.6% of the population.

There were 537 households, 58.2% of which were heterosexual married couples living together (Pennsylvania did not start performing same-sex marriages until May 20, 2014), and 23.8% of which had children under the age of 18 living with them. 3.4% had a male householder with no wife present, while 11.5% had a female householder with no husband present, and 24.6% of households were non-families. 20.3% of all households were made up of individuals, 9.8% of which consisted of an individual 65 years of age or older. The average household size was 2.38 and the average family size was 2.70.

The community's population was relatively age-diverse, with 18.5% of residents under the age of 18, 54.8% aged 18 to 64, and 26.7% aged 65 years of age or older. The median age was 51.1 years.

The median income for a household in the community was $53,046, and the median income for a family was $64,719. The median income for male full-time, year-round workers was $49,087, while similar females had a median income of $38,635. The per capita income for the community was $28,155. About 11.3% of families and 15.4% of the population were below the poverty threshold, including 21.6% of those under age 18 and 9.4% of those ages 65 or over.

References

Census-designated places in Wayne County, Pennsylvania
Census-designated places in Pennsylvania